Bernard Johannes "Joost" Eerdmans (born 9 January 1971) is a Dutch politician, broadcaster and former civil servant who has served as Leader of JA21 since 18 December 2020, a party he co-founded with Annabel Nanninga. Elected to the House of Representatives in the 2021 general election, he took office on 31 March 2021. Eerdmans had previously served as a member of the House of Representatives from 23 May 2002 until 30 November 2006 for the Pim Fortuyn List (LPF) and as an Independent.

Early life
Bernard Johannes Eerdmans was born on 9 January 1971 in Harderwijk in the province of Gelderland in a Reformed family. He graduated at the Christelijk College Nassau-Veluwe. After that, Eerdmans studied Management Science at the Erasmus Universiteit in Rotterdam. In 1995 he received his master's degree, having undertaken postgraduate studies at the Public administration School for Public and Environmental Affairs at Indiana University in Bloomington, Indiana, in 1993. He is the cousin of Dutch author and game show host Theo Eerdmans.

Politics
After working for some time on projects for the Christian Democratic Appeal, Eerdmans worked at the Ministry of Justice from 1997 until 1999. In 1999 he became secretary to Ivo Opstelten, the Mayor of Rotterdam.

Pim Fortuyn List
In 2002 Eerdmans contacted Pim Fortuyn, who at that time was busy assembling a list of candidates for his new political party, the Pim Fortuyn List (LPF). Eerdmans was placed nineteenth on the list and after the 2002 election he became a member of the House of Representatives, while his party joined the First Balkenende cabinet.

After the fall of the cabinet, new elections were called. This time the LPF won only eight seats, but since Eerdmans was second on the list he remained in Parliament. He was removed from the party's parliamentary faction after it was definitively announced that Eerdmans would be on the One NL candidate list for the 2006 election.

One NL
For the 2006 general election, Eerdmans split with the LPF to form a new political party called One NL with Marco Pastors of Leefbaar Rotterdam. After the dismal result of One NL in the 2006 election, Eerdmans left Dutch politics.

Leefbaar Rotterdam
Eerdmans made a return to local politics when he was elected lijsttrekker of Leefbaar Rotterdam on 6 October 2013. In the local elections of 2014 Leefbaar Rotterdam became the biggest party in Rotterdam, meaning the party would get the chance to lead the formation of a new coalition. The party subsequently formed a coalition with the Democrats 66 (D66) and Christian Democratic Appeal (CDA), in which Eerdmans became an alderman.

Forum for Democracy 
For the 2021 general election, Eerdmans announced a return to national politics and was to be fourth on the party list of Forum for Democracy (FvD) led by Thierry Baudet. However, he quit the party soon after the announcement, citing the party's handling of antisemitism, homophobia and racism scandals from other party members, before it could be effectuated.

JA21
After leaving the Forum for Democracy, Eerdmans founded a new political party JA21 (Right Answer 2021) with ex-FvD members which aimed to compete in the 2021 general election. Eerdmans was appointed party leader and lijsttrekker of JA21. JA21 gained 3 seats in the parliament and he returned as an MP to the House of Representatives for the first time since 2006.

Career outside politics
Eerdmans was a television host on the Dutch channel Het Gesprek. He was also one of the hosts of the Dutch programme TROS Regelrecht. He also serves on the panel for the annual  Pim Fortuyn Prize which is awarded to politicians, commentators or public figures who best convey the ideas of Pim Fortuyn.

Personal life 
Eerdmans is married to Femke Bouka since 2006. He was raised in the Dutch Reformed Church, but later lost his faith and became an atheist; despite this, he and his wife, who is also an atheist, married in church.

Electoral history

References

External links
Official
  Drs. B.J. (Joost) Eerdmans Parlement & Politiek

1971 births
Living people
20th-century Dutch civil servants
21st-century Dutch civil servants
21st-century Dutch politicians
Aldermen in South Holland
Aldermen of Rotterdam
Christian Democratic Appeal politicians
Dutch campaign managers
Dutch columnists
Dutch expatriates in the United States
Dutch management consultants
Dutch political commentators
Dutch political consultants
Dutch political party founders
Dutch political writers
Dutch radio personalities
Dutch speechwriters
Dutch television presenters
Erasmus University Rotterdam alumni
Forum for Democracy (Netherlands) politicians
Independent politicians in the Netherlands
Indiana University Bloomington alumni
JA21 politicians
Livable Rotterdam politicians
Members of the House of Representatives (Netherlands)
Municipal councillors of Rotterdam
One NL politicians
People from Capelle aan den IJssel
People from Harderwijk
Pim Fortuyn List politicians
Protestant Church Christians from the Netherlands